Dirioxa is a genus of tephritid or fruit flies in the family Tephritidae. It occurs in Australia, mainly along the eastern coast.

Species 

 Dirioxa fuscipennis
 Dirioxa pornia

References

Trypetinae
Tephritidae genera